Eugene Friesen (born 1952) is an American cellist and composer.

Early life
Friesen was born in 1952 to Russian Mennonite parents. He is a graduate of the Yale School of Music.

Career
Friesen has been a member of the Paul Winter Consort since 1978, and performs with Howard Levy and Glen Velez as Trio Globo. He received a Grammy Award as a member of the Paul Winter Consort for the 1994 album Spanish Angel and again in 2006 for the Consort's Silver Solstice in 2007 for Crestone, and in 2011 for Miho: Journey to the Mountain. Friesen has won four Grammy Awards to date.

In 2012, Friesen's book, Improvisation for Classical Musicians was published by Berklee Press/Hal Leonard.

He teaches at the Berklee College of Music in Boston, Massachusetts and lives in Vermont. Among his prominent students are Rushad Eggleston, Mads Tolling, Lindsay Mac, and Nathan Leath. Friesen also runs a nonprofit production company, Sonoterra Productions, producing concerts, recordings and workshops.

Discography

As leader
 New Friend with Paul Halley (Living Music, 1986)
 Arms Around You (Living Music, 1989)
 The Bremen Town Musicians (1993)
 Sono Miho (2004)

As sideman
With Scott Cossu
 Islands (Windham Hill, 1984)
 Reunion (Windham Hill, 1986)
 Switchback (Windham Hill, 1989)

With Aine Minogue
 Celtic Meditation Music (Sounds True, 2004)
 Celtic Lamentations (Sounds True, 2005)
 Celtic Pilgrimage (Sounds True, 2007)
 In the Name of Stillness (Little Miller 2017)

With Paul Winter
 Callings (Living Music, 1980)
 Missa GaiaEarth Mass (Living Music, 1982)
 Canyon (Living Music, 1985)
 Concert for the Earth (Living Music, 1985)
 Wintersong (Living Music, 1986)
 Whales Alive (Living Music, 1986)
 Earthbeat (Living Music, 1987)
 Wolf Eyes (Living Music, 1988)
 Earth: Voices of a Planet (Living Music, 1990)
 El Hombre Que Plantaba Arboles (Lyricon, 1993)
 Solstice Live! (Living Music, 1993)
 Spanish Angel (Living Music, 1993)
 Prayer for the Wild Things (Living Music, 1994)
 En Directo en Espana (Ediciones Resistencia 1996)
 Journey with the Sun (Living Music, 2000)
 Silver Solstice (Living Music, 2005)
 Crestone (Living Music, 2007)
 Miho: Journey to the Mountain (Living Music, 2010)

With others
 William Ackerman, Conferring with the Moon (Windham Hill, 1986)
 William Ackerman, Meditations (Lifescapes/Compass, 2008)
 Terry Bozzio, Prime Cuts from Terry Bozzio's Magna Carta Sessions (Magna Carta, 2005)
 Betty Buckley, With One Look (Sterling, 1994)
 Oscar Castro-Neves, Oscar! (Living Music, 1987)
 Lui Collins, Moondancer Molly (Gamblin Music, 1993)
 Anthony Davis, Hemispheres (Gramavision, 1983)
 Dream Theater, Train of Thought (Elektra, 2003)
 Flow, Flow (LMB Music, 2017)
 Charles Gross, Punchline (A&M, 1988)
 Paul Halley, Angel on a Stone Wall (Living Music, 1991)
 Phil Markowitz, Taxi Ride (Passage, 1998)
 Emi Meyer, Monochrome (Origin, 2017)
 Susan Osborn, Signature (Lifeline, 1983)
 Jeff Oster, True (Retso, 2007)
 Alice Parker, Heavenly Hurt: Poems by Emily Dickinson (Gothic 2017)
 Noirin Ni Riain, Celtic Soul (Living Music, 1996)
 Jordan Rudess, Feeding the Wheel (Magna Carta, 2001)
 Laura Sullivan, Love's River (Sentient Spirit, 2013)
 Toots Thielemans, The Brasil Project, Vol. 2 (Private Music, 1993)
 Arto Tuncboyaciyan, Every Day Is a New Life (Living Music, 2000)
 Glen Velez, Breathing Rhythms (Sounds True, 2000)

References

External links
Eugene Friesen recordings
Eugene Friesen biography 
Eugene Friesen's official site
The Official Website of Mads Tolling
Sonoterra Productions

American male composers
American cellists
1952 births
Living people
Yale School of Music alumni
Berklee College of Music faculty
Place of birth missing (living people)
Paul Winter Consort members
American Mennonites
Mennonite musicians